The banded eagle ray (Aetomylaeus nichofii) is a species of fish in the family Myliobatidae. It is found in Australia, Bangladesh, Brunei, Cambodia, China, India, Indonesia, Japan, North Korea, South Korea, Malaysia, Myanmar, Pakistan, Papua New Guinea, the Philippines, Singapore, Sri Lanka, Taiwan, Thailand, Vietnam, possibly Maldives, and possibly Mozambique. Its natural habitats are open seas, shallow seas, and coral reefs, where it is threatened by habitat loss.

References

 Kyne, P.M., Compagno, L.J.V. & Bennett, M.B. 2003.  Aetomylaeus nichofii.   2006 IUCN Red List of Threatened Species.   Downloaded on 3 August 2007.

External links
 Species Description of Aetomylaeus nichofii at www.shark-references.com

Aetomylaeus
Fish described in 1801
Taxonomy articles created by Polbot